BLIGHT. Records is an independent record label based in Washington, DC.

Background 
Founded in 2012 by Benjamin Schurr, BLIGHT. Records has released works by artists with influences ranging from experimental pop to electronic and industrial.

The label has garnered attention for its "embrace of experimentalism" and a tendency to "shift away from genre-specific releases and toward a melting pot of musical and visual ideas."  Washington City Paper describes the label as "a creative collective where like-minded musicians move fluidly between each other’s projects," even as such projects retain their own distinct identities.

Electronic elements are explored throughout a number of the label's releases.  Examinations of identity, politics, gender and sexuality can also be found frequently across albums.

Format 
BLIGHT. Records primarily utilizes the cassette tape format for its releases.

Artists 
The following is a list of artists with works released on BLIGHT. Records:

 Kamyar Arsani
Seán Barna (ft. Paperhaus)
 Blacklodge + em.g
 Br'er
 Bruisey Peets 
 CrushnPain 
 DAIS
 Forgetter
 The Galaxy Electric
 Hallowed Bells
 Hollow Boys
 Laughing Man
 Loi Loi
Luna Honey
Nyxy Nyx
 Ó (formerly Eskimeaux)
 Park Snakes 
 Pree
 Reighnbeau
 Sister Grotto
 Sleepy Kitty
 Stronger Sex
 Swoll  
Tadzio
 Tölva

References

External links 
 BLIGHT. Records Official Website
 BLIGHT. Records on SoundCloud
 BLIGHT. Records on YouTube

American independent record labels
Companies based in Washington, D.C.